Stéphane Badul (born February 3, 1983) is a Mauritian footballer who currently plays for Petite Rivière Noire SC in the Mauritian League as a midfielder.

Career

Senior career
Badul has played for numerous clubs in Mauritius, including ASVP and Petite Rivière Noire SC, his current club.

Controversy
During the 2011 Mauritian League, ASPL 2000 accused Badul of playing for his club Petite Rivière Noire SC illegally due to yellow card accumulation. The MFA looked into the matter and suspended Badul from taking part in domestic footballing activities for 6 months.

International career
Badul has represented Mauritius since 2007.

References

External links

Living people
1983 births
Mauritian footballers
Mauritius international footballers
Petite Rivière Noire FC players
Mauritian Premier League players
Association football midfielders